USS Fairview (EPCE(R)-850) was a United States Navy PCE(R)-848-class Patrol Craft Escort (Rescue), in commission from April 1944 to May 1968. It was named after Fairview, New Jersey. The ship was present at the surrender of Japan in Tokyo Bay at the end of World War II.

Role
The PCER-848 class was an armed rescue ship built on the hull of the PCE (Patrol Craft Escort) by the Pullman-Standard Car Manufacturing Company in Chicago, Illinois. The ships were to serve three missions: damage control / firefighting; casualty treatment / evacuation; and patrol / guardship. Each ship's hospital contained 65 beds, with a surgical suite, and X-ray facilities. The medical department consisted of a staff of 11 doctors and hospital corpsmen.

Three ships of the class—PCER-848, -849 and -850—were refitted and their hospital spaces converted into communications centers to support the US Army's activities in the Pacific Theater.

Service history
The ship was laid down on 6 October 1943 by the Pullman-Standard Car Manufacturing Company of Chicago, and launched on 8 February 1944. Commissioned as USS PCE(R)-850 on 17 April 1944, the ship was converted to a communications ship at Brisbane, Australia, in September 1944.

The ship was engaged in testing anti-submarine devices during the period of 1948–1950, based out of New London, Connecticut. It was named USS Fairview on 15 February 1956, and was reclassified as EPCE(R)-850, an Experimental Patrol Craft Escort (Rescue), in 1959.

The ship was decommissioned on 1 May 1968, and later sold.

See also
 USS Somersworth PCE(R)-849

References

External links 
 
Fairview content at Naval History and Heritage Command

PCE(R)-848-class patrol craft
1944 ships
Ships built in Chicago